Sodium picosulfate (INN, also known as sodium picosulphate) is a contact stimulant laxative used as a treatment for constipation or to prepare the large bowel before colonoscopy or surgery. It is sold under the trade names Sodipic Picofast, Laxoberal, Laxoberon,  Purg-Odan, Picolax, Guttalax, Namilax, Pico-Salax, PicoPrep, and Prepopik, among others.

It is available as a generic medication.

Effects
Orally administered sodium picosulfate is generally used for thorough evacuation of the bowel, usually for patients who are preparing to undergo a colonoscopy. It takes 12–24 hours to work, since it works in the colon.

Abdominal cramps and diarrhea are normal effects of picosulfate and should be expected.

The use of sodium picosulfate has also been associated with certain electrolyte disturbances, such as hyponatremia and hypokalemia. Patients are often required to drink large amounts of clear fluids, to compensate for dehydration and to reestablish normal electrolyte balance.

Mechanism of action 
Sodium picosulfate is a prodrug. It has no significant direct physiological effect on the intestine; however, it is metabolised by gut bacteria into the active compound 4,4'-dihydroxydiphenyl-(2-pyridyl)methane (DPM, BHPM). This compound is a stimulant laxative and increases peristalsis in the gut.

Sodium picosulfate is typically prescribed in a combined formulation with magnesium citrate, an osmotic laxative. This combination is a highly effective laxative, often prescribed to patients for bowel cleansing prior to colonoscopies.

References 

2-Pyridyl compounds
Laxatives
Organic sodium salts
Sulfate esters